Cold is the presence of low temperature, especially in the atmosphere.

Cold or COLD may also refer to:

Medicine
 Chest cold, a short-term inflammation of the airways (bronchi) of the lungs
 Chronic obstructive lung disease, a type of progressive lung disease
 Common cold, a viral infectious disease of the upper respiratory system

Arts, entertainment and media

Music

Groups
 Cold (band), a post-grunge band
 The Cold (rock band), a new wave band

Albums

 Cold (Cold album), 1998
 Cold (Lycia album), 1996
 Cold (mixtape), 2013 by James Ferraro
 Coldness (album), 2004 by power metal band Kotipelto
 The Cold (album), 2010 by thrash metal band Flotsam And Jetsam

Songs

 "Cold" (Annie Lennox song), 1992
 "Cold (But I'm Still Here)", a 2005 song by Evans Blue
 Cold (Chris Stapleton song), 2020
 "Cold" (Crossfade song), 2004
 "Cold" (Deep Obsession song), 1999
 "Cold" (Five Finger Death Punch song), 2013
 "Cold" (Kanye West song), 2012
 "Cold" (Korn song), 2019
 "Cold" (Maroon 5 song), 2017
 "Cold" (Maxwell song), 2009
 "Cold" (O'G3NE song), 2015
 "Cold" (Static-X song), 2002
 "Cold" (Stormzy song), 2017
 "Cold" (Tears for Fears song), 1993
 "Cold", by At the Gates from the album Slaughter of the Soul
 "Cold", by Before the Dawn from the album Soundscape of Silence
 "Cold", by Craig David
 "Cold", by the Cure from the album Pornography, 1982
 "Cold", by James Blunt from the album Once Upon a Mind
 "Cold", by John Gary
 "Cold", by Julian Lennon from the album Photograph Smile
 "Cold", by Lacuna Coil from In a Reverie
 "Cold", by Matchbox Twenty from the album More Than You Think You Are
 "Cold", by Nicole Scherzinger
 "Cold", by Rae Morris from the album Unguarded
 "The Cold", by Ryan Adams from the album Prisoner: End of the World Edition
 "Cold", by Siobhan Fahey from the album Songs from the Red Room
 "Cold", by Stabbing Westward from the EP Dead and Gone

Film 
 Cold (film), a 2013 Irish film by and with Eoin Macken

Television
 "Cold" (Law & Order: Special Victims Unit)
 "The Cold" (Modern Family), an episode from the TV series Modern Family
 "The Cold", an episode of season 7 of The West Wing

Other fiction
 Cold (novel), a 1996 James Bond novel by John Gardner
 Captain Cold, American animated supervillain

Other uses
 Computer Output to Laser Disc, a method of data storage and retrieval

See also
 Cold River (disambiguation)
 Cold War (disambiguation)
 Colder (disambiguation)
 Coldplay, an English pop/rock band